Stefan Sonvilla-Weiss (born 10 April 1961, Wels) is an Austrian communications scholar and art/media educator. He is professor of media design and head of the institute of art and education at the University of Art and Design Linz University of Arts and Industrial Design Linz.

Until 2014 he was professor of communication and education technologies in visual culture at the Aalto University, School of Art and Design in Helsinki. Sonvilla-Weiss was head of the international Master of Arts study programme He is author and editor of several books, including Mashup Cultures and (IN)VISIBLE. Learning to Act in the Metaverse.

References

Living people
1961 births
People from Wels
Academic staff of the University of Arts and Industrial Design Linz